The  is a series of kei cars, kei truck and microvan manufactured by Daihatsu and sold under the Toyota marque, both owned by Toyota Motor Corporation. The name "Pixis" is derived from words "pixie" or "pixy". All the vehicles are rebadged variants of Daihatsu cars:

 Toyota Pixis Epoch, a rebadged Daihatsu Mira e:S kei car sold since 2012
 Toyota Pixis Space, a rebadged Daihatsu Move Conte kei car sold between 2011 and 2017
 Toyota Pixis Joy, a rebadged Daihatsu Cast kei car sold since 2016
 Toyota Pixis Mega, a rebadged Daihatsu Wake kei car sold between 2015 and 2022
 Toyota Pixis Truck, a rebadged Daihatsu Hijet kei truck sold since 2011
 Toyota Pixis Van, a rebadged Daihatsu Hijet Cargo microvan sold since 2011

References 

Pixis
Cars introduced in 2011
Kei cars